Radzi Bin Mohd Hussin (born 12 June 1986) is a Malaysian footballer, currently playing for Sabah FA as a midfielder.

References

1986 births
Living people
Malaysian footballers
Sabah F.C. (Malaysia) players
People from Sabah

Association football midfielders